The William Tichenor House, near Upton, Kentucky, is a historic house built around 1820.  It was listed on the National Register of Historic Places in 1988.

It was built as a two-story dogtrot-style double pen house.  The breezeway was later enclosed (c.1910).  A separate log kitchen was linked by a frame addition c.1900.

It became the home of the William Tichenor family;  William Tichenor was a shareholder in the 1896 formation of the Sonora Bank and he had a large farm south of
Sonora.

It was deemed notable "as a relatively unaltered example of a two-story dogtrot style home. It is one of the five most significant dogtrot log homes located in the county and retains its original plan."

References

Houses on the National Register of Historic Places in Kentucky
Houses completed in 1820
National Register of Historic Places in Hardin County, Kentucky
1820 establishments in Kentucky
Dogtrot architecture in Kentucky
Double pen architecture in the United States